Elif is a unisex name that is most commonly given to females in Turkey, but is also popular in other countries such as the Netherlands. It originates from the Turkish word for the first letter of the Ottoman Turkish alphabet or the Arabic script  . Like the shape of the letter, it is thus taken to mean 'slender or upright'. In context of the Turkish War of Independence (1919–23), the genre of s, related to the Black Fatma, represents "ordinary women helping their men" fighting on the fronts.

List of people 
Notable Turkish people (unless otherwise mentioned) with this name include: 
Elif Ağca (born 1984), volleyball player
Elif Sıla Aydın (born 1996), handball player
Elif Batuman (born 1977), American author, academic, journalist
Elif Demirezer (born 1992), German-Turkish pop singer and songwriter
Elif Deniz (born 1993), footballer
İlayda Elif Elhih, actress
Elif Elmas (born 1999), footballer from North Macedonia
Elif Gülbayrak (born 1988), volleyball player
Elif Keskin (born 2002), women's footballer
Elif Kızılkaya (born 1991), curler
Elif Köroğlu, football referee
Elif Shafak, Turkish-British writer and activist
Begünhan Elif Ünsal (born 1993), archer
Elif Jale Yeşilırmak (born 1986), Turkish wrestler of Russian origin
Elif Yıldırım (born 1990), middle-distance runner.

See also 

Alpha (name)

References 

Unisex given names
Turkish unisex given names
Arabic unisex given names